Benjamin Charles Aldridge is an English actor. He is best known for his portrayals of Arsehole Guy in the dramedy series Fleabag (2016–2019), Captain Charles James in the BBC drama  Our Girl  (2013–2020), and Thomas Wayne in the crime drama series Pennyworth (2019–2023). He also stars in feature films Spoiler Alert (2022) and Knock at the Cabin (2023).

Early life and education
Having worked with the National Youth Theatre, Aldridge graduated from the London Academy of Music and Dramatic Art with a bursary from the Genesis Foundation for young actors. He left early to begin filming the 2009 ITV film Compulsion alongside Ray Winstone and Parminder Nagra.

Career
Aldridge's first professional acting role was in a play  at Lyric Theatre, Hammersmith in 2004. In 2008, Aldridge made his television debut in Channel 4's four-part miniseries The Devil's Whore, playing Harry Fanshawe, husband of the title character. That same year, he was featured on Screen International's "Stars of Tomorrow" list. In addition to First Light, Lewis, Toast and Vera, Aldridge also appeared as Daniel Parish in the BBC One period drama Lark Rise to Candleford. In 2011, the American network The CW cast Aldridge as the lead in the pilot Heavenly. Later on he spent time in Belgrade shooting the partially improvised romance short film In the Night for director Ivana Bobic and award-winning cinematographer Rain Li, alongside supermodel Danijela Dimitrovska.

Aldridge is a co-founder of "In the Corner Productions". He directed the comedy pilot Pet Shop Girls in late 2011, which he co-wrote and co-produced with actor-writers Luke Norris, Ed Hancock and Kirsty Woodward.

In 2013, Aldridge starred in Almeida Theatre's production of American Psycho as Paul Owen, opposite Matt Smith, Susannah Fielding, Jonathan Bailey, and Lucie Jones. The musical thriller featured a book by Roberto Aguirre-Sacasa based on Bret Easton Ellis's cult novel, with music and lyrics by Duncan Sheik. In September 2014, he joined BBC's original drama series Our Girl as Captain Charles James. He left the role after the third series in 2018. In December 2014, Aldridge joined The CW's series Reign as King Antoine of Navarre.

Personal life
Aldridge was raised as an evangelical Christian. Both his parents and grandparents were raised in the Plymouth Brethren church, although his parents both left the denomination at age 18. Commenting on his current relationship with religion, Aldridge stated in a 2021 interview, "It feels very far away in some respects as there isn't a religious aspect to my life now."

In 2020, Aldridge came out as a member of the LGBTQ+ community in a post on Instagram on the occasion of National Coming Out Day. In a 2021 interview with Attitude magazine, he self-identified as gay.

Filmography

Film

Television

Video game

Stage

References

External links
 

1985 births
21st-century English male actors
Alumni of the London Academy of Music and Dramatic Art
English male film actors
English male television actors
English male stage actors
English gay actors
Actors from Exeter
English LGBT actors
Living people
Male actors from Devon
National Youth Theatre members
20th-century English LGBT people
21st-century English LGBT people